Hans Kohn (September 15, 1891 – March 16, 1971) was an American philosopher and historian. He pioneered the academic study of nationalism, and is considered an authority on the subject.

Life
Kohn was born into a German-speaking Jewish family in Prague, Bohemia, then part of the Austro-Hungarian Empire. After graduating from a local German Gymnasium (high school) in 1909, he studied philosophy, political science and law at the German part of Charles-Ferdinand University in Prague.

Shortly after graduation, in late 1914 Kohn was called into the infantry of the Austro-Hungarian Army. Following training he was sent to the Eastern Front in the Carpathian Mountains, facing the Imperial Russian Army. He was captured in 1915 and taken by the Russians to a prison camp in Central Asia (in present-day Turkmenistan). During the civil war following the Bolshevik revolution, the pro-western Czechoslovak Legions came into Central Asia and he was set free. With them he traveled further east (called by Czechs the "Siberian Anabasis"), until stopping at Irkutsk. The political situation then allowed him to return to Europe, arriving in 1920.

Kohn then lived in Paris, where he married Jetty Wahl in 1921.

The couple moved to London, where Kohn worked for Zionist organizations and wrote articles for newspapers. He moved to Palestine in 1925. From there he would frequently visit the United States. His writings began to generate books, where he discussed current geopolitics and nationalism. Eventually the couple immigrated to America in 1934.

They had one son, Immanuel Kohn.

Kohn was a prominent leader of Brit Shalom, which promoted a binational solution for promoting the co-existence of Jews and Arabs in the Mandatory Palestine.

Career
Kohn taught modern history at Smith College in Northampton, Massachusetts. From 1948 to 1961, he taught at City College of New York. He also taught at the New School for Social Research, Harvard Summer School.

He wrote numerous books on nationalism, Pan-Slavism, German thought, and Judaism. He was an early contributor to the Foreign Policy Research Institute in Philadelphia.

In 1944, he published his major work, The Idea of Nationalism, on the dichotomy between western and eastern Nationalism. Kohn sought to understand the emergence of nationalism through the development of western civilization and the rise of liberalism. He also published a biography of Martin Buber. His autobiography, published in 1964, includes reflections on his times and his personal life.

Selected works 
 A History of Nationalism in the East, 1929 
 Nationalism and Imperialism in the Hither East, 1932
 Nationalism in the Soviet Union, 1932 [1966]
 Western Civilization in the Near East, 1936 
 Force Or Reason: Issues of the Twentieth Century, 1938 
 The Idea of Nationalism: A Study in Its Origins and Background, 1944
 The Twentieth Century: A Midway Account of the Western World, 1950
 Pan-Slavism: Its History and Ideology, 1953
 African Nationalism in the Twentieth Century, 1953, co-author
 Nationalism and Liberty: The Swiss Example, George Allen and Unwin, London, 1956
 American Nationalism: An Interpretative Essay, Macmillan, New York, 1957
Is the Liberal West in Decline? Pall Mall Press, 1957
 Zion and the Jewish National Idea, Menorah, 1958, 63 p.
 Heinrich Heine: The Man and the Myth, Leo Baeck Institute, New York, 1959
 The Mind of Germany, Charles Scribner's Sons 1960, Harper Torchbooks 1965
 The Habsburg Empire, 1804–1918, 1961
 Living in a World Revolution: My Encounters with History, Simon and Schuster, New York, 1964
 Nationalism: Its Meaning & History, 1965, reprint/revised, 1982 
 A History of the European Century, vol. 1: Absolutism and Democracy 1814–1852, D. Van Nostrand, Princeton, New Jersey, 1965
 Prelude to Nation-States: The French and German Experiences, 1789–1815 D. Van Nostrand, 1967

References

Further reading
 Gordon, Adi. Towards Nationalism's End: An Intellectual Biography of Hans Kohn, Brandeis (2017).
 Gordon, Adi. "The Need for West: Hans Kohn and the North Atlantic Community." Journal of Contemporary History 46#1 (2011): 33–57.
 Kohn, Hans. Living in a World Revolution: My Encounters with History (1964), Autobiography, a primary source.
 Liebich, Andre. "Searching for the perfect nation: the itinerary of Hans Kohn (1891–1971)." Nations and Nationalism 12.4 (2006): 579–596.
 Maor, Zohar. "Hans Kohn and the Dialectics of Colonialism: Insights on Nationalism and Colonialism from Within". Leo Baeck Institute Yearbook 55 (1): 255–271. doi:10.1093/lbyb/ybq038.
 Wolf, Ken. "Hans Kohn's liberal nationalism: the historian as prophet." Journal of the History of Ideas 37, n. 4 (1976): 651–672. in JSTOR

External links 

 

20th-century American historians
20th-century American male writers
American Zionists
Czech Jews
Czechoslovak emigrants to the United States
Smith College faculty
Jewish historians
Scholars of nationalism
Harvard Summer School instructors
Writers from Prague
1891 births
1971 deaths
Foreign Policy Research Institute
American male non-fiction writers
Member of the Mont Pelerin Society